Řehák or Rehák is a Czech and Slovak surname, which is derived from the given name Řehoř, the Czech form of Gregory. The name may refer to:

 Dagmar Rehak (born 1956), German swimmer 
 Daniel Rehák (born 1985), Slovak football player
 Frank Rehak (1926–1987), American musician
 Gonzalo Rehak (born 1984), Argentine football player
 Jeremie Rehak (born 1988), American Major League Baseball umpire
 Martin Řehák, Czech athlete
 Matej Rehák (born 1990), Slovak football player
 Paul Rehak (1954–2004), American archaeologist
 Pavel Řehák (born 1963), Czech football player
 Rudolf Rehák, Slovak football player
 Theo Rehak (born 1947), American graphic designer
 Daniel Rehak (born 2000), Hungarian COD champion

See also

References

Surnames from given names

Czech-language surnames
Slovak-language surnames